Raffo may refer to:
 , a frazione of Petralia Soprana, Sicily, Italy
 Heather Raffo, Iraqi American playwright and actress
 Laura Raffo, Uruguayan economist and politician
 Silvio Raffo, Italian writer and translator
 Tommy Raffo, American college baseball coach and former first baseman.

See also 

 Raffa (disambiguation)